Edvard Bergenheim, previously  Bergenhem (18 September 1798 – 19 February 1884) was the Archbishop of Turku and the spiritual head of the Evangelical Lutheran Church of Finland between 1850 and 1884.

Biography
Bergenheim was born on 18 September 1798 in Vaasa in the Kingdom of Sweden, the son of Erik Johan Bergenheim and Hedvig Sofia Hannelius. He graduated in 1817 with a Bachelor of Arts and in 1823 with a Master of Philosophy from Royal Academy of Turku. Bergenheim was a teacher at the Hamina Cadet School and taught history, geography and statistics. Bergenheim completed his theological studies in December 1830 and was ordained priest. He served as a lecturer, rector and second vice-rector of history at Turku High School between 1832 and 1844. In 1850 he was appointed Archbishop of Turku and was consecrated in Porvoo Cathedral on 24 May 1850. Bergenheim married Aleksandra Bruun in 1832. He was a member of the House of Nobility since 1837.

External links

BERGENHEIM, Edvard 

1798 births
1884 deaths
People from Vaasa
Lutheran archbishops and bishops of Turku
19th-century Lutheran archbishops
19th-century Finnish people